Tayai is a 2008 Indian Meitei language film directed by K. Bimal Sharma and produced by Gokul Athokpam under the banner of Subhas and Sons'. It stars Gokul Athokpam, Kaiku Rajkumar, Lairenjam Olen, Huirem Seema, Prameshwori and Laishram Binata in the lead roles. The premiere show of the movie was held at Asha Cinema on 16 November 2008 and censored in 2009. 

The film got official selection at the 7th Manipur State Film Festival 2010.

Synopsis
Tayai aka Yaima is an orphan. He is adopted by Ibochouba's father. He grows up to be a guy of cheerful and joyous nature. An incident happens where Ibochouba's wife Tharo falls victim to the blackmailing done by her ex-lover. It leads to Tharo initially falling into debt trap and later killing her ex-lover. Yaima gets to know about all this and decides to bear the burden. This leads him to be separated from his family. He never hesitates to help his family members wherever possible despite getting the bad name. Tharo finally reveals the truth and the family members regret for what they had done to Yaima.

Cast
 Gokul Athokpam as Yaima
 Lairenjam Olen as Ibochouba
 Kaiku Rajkumar as Mani
 Huirem Seema as Tharo
 Prameshwori as Langlen
 Laishram Binata as Tampha
 Gurumayum Priyogopal as Ibochouba's father
 Hidangmayum Guna as Thoiba
 Tayenjam Mema as Shopkeeper
 Heisnam Geeta as Ibochouba's mother
 Benu as Yaima's vehicle owner
 Shougrakpam Hemanta as Teacher
 Rajkumar Amarjeet as Tharo's ex-boyfriend (Guest appearance)
 O. Mangi as Leishabi
 Rojesh
 Rajesh
 Master Chingkheinganba as Master Yaima
 Master Cleiton as Master Ibochouba
 Baby Sneha as Baby Langlen
 Baby Saya as Baby Tampha/Tamphasana

Soundtrack
Ranbir Thouna composed the soundtrack for the film and Biramangol Mekola wrote the lyrics. The song is titled Awabana Saruk Oiraba.

References

Meitei-language films
2009 films
Cinema of Manipur